The Miraculous Supernatural Tour is an ongoing concert tour by American Latin rock band Santana. The tour is in support of their twenty-fifth album Africa Speaks (2019), and it consists of concerts in North America. The tour is a continuation of the band's Supernatural Now Tour (2019). The tour was announced in February 2020, with dates being released at the same time. The show is produced by Live Nation Entertainment, and each tour date will be opened by Earth, Wind & Fire. The band is slated to perform songs from their landmark album Supernatural (1999), selections from Africa Speaks, and other hits.

Background and development 
On February 25, 2020, Santana announced the Miraculous Supernatural Tour, to support their twenty-fifth album Africa Speaks (2019). Tour dates were released on the same day and tickets were released on February 28, 2020. Live Nation Entertainment was announced as the tour's producers, and each tour date will be opened by Earth, Wind & Fire. The tour is a continuation of their Supernatural Now Tour of 2019, with the band slated to perform songs from their popular album Supernatural (1999), selections from Africa Speaks, and other hits. However, due to the COVID-19 pandemic, the entire tour was postponed twice to 2022. New tour dates were revealed on April 23, 2021.

Tour dates

Canceled tour dates

Notes

References

External links 

Santana (band) concert tours
2022 concert tours
Concert tours of North America